A natural disaster is a major adverse event resulting from natural processes of the Earth.

It may also be:

 an album: A Natural Disaster
 a song:
 Natural Disaster (Plain White T's song)
 Natural Disaster (Example song)